Lacey Schuckman is an American mixed martial artist who competes in the Strawweight division. She has fought in Invicta FC and  Strikeforce.

Mixed martial arts record

|-
| Win
| align=center| 12–10
| Rosa Acevedo
| Decision (unanimous)
| SCL 62: Unbroken
| 
| align=center| 3
| align=center| 5:00
| Denver, Colorado, United States
| 
|-
| Loss
| align=center| 11–10
| Molly McCann
| Decision (split)
| Cage Warriors 82: Pimblett vs. Narimani
| 
| align=center| 3
| align=center| 5:00
| Liverpool, United Kingdom
| 
|-
| Loss
| align=center| 11–9
| Mizuki Inoue
| Submission (armbar)
| Invicta FC 15: Cyborg vs. Ibragimova
| 
| align=center| 3
| align=center| 3:41
| Costa Mesa, California, United States
| 
|-
| Win
| align=center| 11–8
| Jenny Liou
| TKO (punches)
| Invicta FC 12: Kankaanpää vs. Souza
| 
| align=center| 1
| align=center| 1:53
| Kansas City, Missouri, United States
| 
|-
| Loss
| align=center| 10–8
| Brenda Gonzalez
| Decision (unanimous)
| Mosley Showdown/Swarm Entertainment: SuperBrawl 1
| 
| align=center| 3
| align=center| 5:00
| Phoenix, Arizona, United States
| 
|-
| Win
| align=center| 10–7
| Melissa Myers
| Submission (rear-naked choke)
| Fight to Win: Animals
| 
| align=center| 1
| align=center| 1:35
| Denver, Colorado, United States
| 
|-
| Loss
| align=center| 9–7
| Amber Stautzenberger
| Decision (unanimous)
| XKO 20
| 
| align=center| 3
| align=center| 5:00
| Arlington, Texas, United States
| 
|-
| Win
| align=center| 9–6
| Jody Lynn Reicher
| Submission (armbar)
| SCL Thunderdome 2
| 
| align=center| 1
| align=center| 0:28
| Denver, Colorado, United States
| 
|-
| Win
| align=center| 8–6
| Darla Harris
| Decision (unanimous)
| SCL Thunderdome
| 
| align=center| 3
| align=center| 5:00
| Denver, Colorado, United States
| 
|-
| Loss
| align=center| 7–6
| Michelle Waterson
| Decision (split)
| Invicta FC 3: Penne vs. Sugiyama
| 
| align=center| 3
| align=center| 5:00
| Kansas City, Kansas, United States
| 
|-
| Loss
| align=center| 7–5
| Ayaka Hamasaki
| Submission (armbar)
| Invicta FC 2: Baszler vs. McMann
| 
| align=center| 3
| align=center| 4:45
| Kansas City, Kansas, United States
| 
|-
| Win
| align=center| 7–4
| Michelle Blalock
| Submission (guillotine choke)
| ROF 42: Who's Next
| 
| align=center| 2
| align=center| 1:02
| Broomfield, Colorado, United States
| 
|-
| Loss
| align=center| 6–4
| Patricia Vidonic
| Submission (rear-naked choke)
| The Beatdown 8: Battle of the Badges 2
| 
| align=center| 3
| align=center| 4:04
| Denver, Colorado, United States
| 
|-
| Win
| align=center| 6–3
| Diana Rael
| Submission (rear-naked choke)
| RMBB Bad Girlz Gone Wild
| 
| align=center| 1
| align=center| 4:08
| Sheridan, Colorado, United States
| 
|-
| Loss
| align=center| 5–3
| Carla Esparza
| Submission (rear-naked choke)
| NMEF Ladies Night: Clash of the Titans 8
| 
| align=center| 2
| align=center| 2:37
| Castle Rock, Colorado, United States
| 
|-
| Win
| align=center| 5–2
| Alyx Hess
| TKO (punches)
| Ring Wars
| 
| align=center| 2
| align=center| 3:37
| Gillette, Wyoming, United States
| 
|-
| Win
| align=center| 4–2
| Avery Vilche
| Decision (unanimous)
| NMEF Annihilation 24: Clash of the Titans 7
| 
| align=center| 3
| align=center| 3:00
| Greeley, Colorado, United States
| 
|-
| Loss
| align=center| 3–2
| Jeri Sitzes
| TKO (punches)
| Strikeforce Challengers: Kennedy vs. Cummings
| 
| align=center| 3
| align=center| 2:18
| Tulsa, Oklahoma, United States
| 
|-
| Win
| align=center| 3–1
| Jess Taylor
| Submission (punches)
| Fearless Fighting Championships
| 
| align=center| 1
| align=center| 4:43
| Superior, Wisconsin, United States
| 
|-
| Win
| align=center| 2–1
| Tammie Schneider
| Submission (rear-naked choke)
| C3 Fights
| 
| align=center| 1
| align=center| 1:59
| Newkirk, Oklahoma, United States
| 
|-
| Loss
| align=center| 1–1
| Lisa Higo
| Decision (unanimous)
| HOOKnSHOOT GFight 2009 Grand Prix
| 
| align=center| 3
| align=center| 3:00
| Evansville, Indiana, United States
| 
|-
| Win
| align=center| 1–0
| Mariah Reed
| Decision (unanimous)
| HOOKnSHOOT GFight 2009 Grand Prix
| 
| align=center| 3
| align=center| 3:00
| Evansville, Indiana, United States
|

See also
 List of current Invicta FC fighters
 List of female mixed martial artists

References

External links

1988 births
Living people
People from Denver
Mixed martial artists from Colorado
American female mixed martial artists
Atomweight mixed martial artists
Strawweight mixed martial artists
21st-century American women